The Manly Selective Campus of the Northern Beaches Secondary College is a government-funded co-educational academically selective secondary day school, located in , a suburb on the Northern Beaches of Sydney, New South Wales, Australia.

Established in 1859 as Manly Public School, the campus caters for students from Year 7 to Year 12; and admission to the campus is based entirely on academic excellence through the Selective High Schools Test. Students seeking enrolment into Years 8 - 11 will be coordinated through the school, and must also sit for the Australian Council of Educational Research (ACER) Higher Ability Selection Test. The school is operated by the New South Wales Department of Education; the principal is Kathryn O'Sullivan.

Overview 
Manly Campus tops the Northern Beaches on Merit List Rankings in the NSW Higher School Certificate (HSC), and came eighth in the state in 2014. It was placed seventh in the 2010, 2012 and 2021 HSC rankings, a leap from 15th in 2008 and 2009, and 20th in 2007. The graduating class of 2021 is currently the highest achieving cohort on record, achieving a ranking of seventh overall as compared with other NSW state and non-government schools. This peer group is the fifth ever to place Manly in the top ten.

History
Manly Selective Campus has a long history after being founded in 1859 as Manly Public School, on the corner of Belgrave and Carlton Streets in Manly. In 1882 it was moved to a site in Darley Road, where it operated until 1945, and is the site of the current Manly Village Public School.

1925 saw the school become an Intermediate High School, and became solely a boys school from 1926. The school expanded rapidly and became Manly Junior High in 1944. In 1945, the school moved to the site of the current Balgowlah Boys Campus, and in 1949 had expanded to include senior years.

In 1954 student numbers reached 1200, and the bulk of these students moved to the current site on Abbott Road in North Curl Curl as Manly Boys High School. The school became co-educational in 1983 and was renamed Manly High School, at the same time as the nearby Manly Girls High also became co-educational and was renamed Freshwater High. Manly High was granted selective status in 1990 and was incorporated into the Northern Beaches Secondary College at its founding and given its current name in 2002.

Principals
The following individuals have served as Principal of the Manly Selective Campus of Northern Beaches Secondary College:

Students and staff
 Manly Selective Campus had a student population of 789 students. There were an average of around 130 students in each grade from 7 to 12, although with some variation between grades, with approximately 60 staff members. There was a large degree of ethnic diversity amongst the student population, with 50% of students coming from a home where English is not the primary language.

The Turtalian
The Turtalian is a former completely student run weekly magazine which contained articles submitted by students, often focused on intellectual discussion. Around 200 copies were distributed each week on Friday, with special editions providing guides for events such as Pinestock, the school's annual music festival, and sporting events such as cross country, athletics and swimming carnivals. The Turtalian Committee handled the editing, design, and printing of the magazine. 

The concept is currently used as a project-based lesson guided by a teacher.

Grounds

One of the prominent images associated with Manly Selective Campus are the stands of Radiata Pines planted around the school, giving the name to the school's yearbook, The Pines and the newsletter, The Weekly Pines. Some of these pines have created a problem in a 7,010 m2 area of remnant bushland that lies on the school's property on a steep hill behind the school oval. Seedlings of the original pines grew up in the bushland after more of the radiata pines were planted in close proximity to the bushland in 1954. This bushland is some of the last remaining native Sandstone Heath east of Pittwater Road in Warringah, however sections of it are highly degraded by weeds such as lantana and asparagus fern. In recent years there has been an increasing effort to rehabilitate the heath back to pre-European quality, and in late 2006 many of the pine trees which had seeded in the bushland were removed.

Extra-curricular activities
Students are given the chance to participate in various extracurricular activities, only some of which are listed below:
 Student Representative Council (SRC)
 Manly School SRC
 Middle Harbour/Peninsula Inter School Group SRC
 Northern Sydney Regional SRC
 NSW State SRC/NSW SRC State Conference Action Team
 Drama Ensemble
 Junior Drama Ensemble
 Senior Drama Ensemble
 Dance Ensemble, various groups
 Coding Club
 Vocal Ensemble
 School Musical
 Chess Team 
 Debating
 Robotics Club 
 Poetry Club
 Maths Club
 Paleontology Club
 Self-Improvement Club
Art Club
Students of Manly also have participated with others from the NBSC in the College Rock Eisteddfod Challenge, until its cancellation due to a lack of funds.

Band program
The band program at Manly has three streams and ten ensembles of various levels including the Concert Stream (comprising the Concert Band, Wind Ensemble, and Symphonic Wind Orchestra), the Stage Band Stream (comprising the Swing Band, Stage Band, Big Band, Jazz Orchestra, and Bennett Frerck's Ensemble of Jazz), and the Strings Stream (comprising the String Ensemble and Chamber Orchestra).

Previously, the Band Program also incorporated a Jazz Improvisation stream, which as of 2012 was changed to the "OffBeat" bands spanning all campuses across the Northern Beaches Secondary College. However, the school has been represented on numerous occasions over countless years of the Schools' Spectacular that showcases the student talent of State School students annually.

On 10 August 2017 the Bands of Manly Selective Campus were cited in the NSW Parliament by James Griffen.

Notable alumni 

 Neville Chynowethseventh Bishop of Gippsland (1980–1987)
 Lisa DarmaninOlympic silver medallist in sailing
 Midget Farrellyworld's first surfboard champion - attended approximately 1958
 Mark Gablelead singer and songwriter with The Choirboys whose name was Mark Kitchen while attending the school
 Brad HazzardMember of Parliament of NSW (1991–present) and NSW government minister (2011–present)
 Reece Hodgerugby union player for Australia and Super 15 side, Melbourne Rebels
 Max Illingworth2014 Australian Chess Champion and Grand Master
 Rex Mossoprugby union and rugby league international and television sports commentator
 Doug Mulrayradio and TV host
 Glenn Murcuttarchitect and winner of the Pritzker Prize in 2002
 Cadeyrn Nevillerugby union player for the ACT Brumbies and Wallabies
 Chris PuplickSenator for New South Wales (1979–1981, 1984–1990)
 Justine Ruszczykmurdered by a Minneapolis Police Department officer

See also

 List of government schools in New South Wales
 List of selective high schools in New South Wales
 Education in Australia

References

External links
 
 Manly Alumni website

Public high schools in Sydney
1859 establishments in Australia
Selective schools in New South Wales
Educational institutions established in 1859
Northern Beaches